The least storm petrel  (Hydrobates microsoma) is a small seabird of the storm petrel family Hydrobatidae. It is 13–15 cm in length, with a wingspan of 32 cm.  It is the smallest member of the order Procellariiformes. It was formerly defined in the genus Oceanodroma before that genus was synonymized with Hydrobates.

It breeds on islands off the Baja Peninsula and Gulf of California of Mexico in rock crevices or small burrows in soft earth and lays a single white egg. Like most petrels, its walking ability is limited to a short shuffle to the burrow. It is a colonial nester.

It spends the rest of the year at sea, reaching as far south as the tropical Pacific South America.  It frequently can be seen well offshore of southern California in late summer and autumn.

It feeds on mainly planktonic crustaceans, with a preference of larvae of spiny lobsters.  It feeds similarly to other storm petrels, picking food off the surface of the water while in flight.

The least storm petrel suffers losses on some of the breeding islands, particularly from feral cats and rats.

References

 "National Geographic"  Field Guide to the Birds of North America 
 Seabirds, an Identification Guide by Peter Harrison, (1983) 
Handbook of the Birds of the World Vol 1,  Josep del Hoyo editor, 
"National Audubon Society" The Sibley Guide to Birds, by David Allen Sibley,

External links
Least Storm-Petrel Oceanodroma microsoma - VIREO

least storm petrel
least storm petrel
Birds of Mexico
Birds of Central America
Birds of Colombia
Birds of Ecuador
least storm petrel
least storm petrel
least storm petrel
least storm petrel
least storm petrel
least storm petrel